Telemetry Orchestra are a Sydney-based electronic music band composed of members Steve Scott, Gavin Angus-Leppan (guitar and vocals) and Charlotte Whittingham. They have released three albums, with several singles receiving regular airplay on national radio broadcaster 2JJJ and the ABC music program rage. In October, 2013 they released a new E.P. called
Out of Nowhere, which includes six tracks written, performed and recorded by Gavin and Charlotte.

The video clip of their 2006 single "Under the Cherry Tree", by Sydney-based digital visual effects company Animal Logic won an award in early 2007 in New York.

Discography

Albums
 Out of Nowhere E.P. (2013)
 Empire (2006)
 Children Stay Free (2003)
 Live Better Electrically (1998)

Singles
 "Smoke and Mirrors" (2016)
 "Silvertongue" (2013)
 "Flicker/Hole in the Roof" (2007)
 "Under the Cherry Tree" (2006)
 "Hazy Elevator" (2006)
 "Under the Knife" (2003)
 "Suburban Harmony" (2003)

References

External links
 http://www.telemetryorchestra.org
 Telemetry Orchestra at Undercovermusic

New South Wales musical groups
Australian electronic musicians